El Heraldo de Cuba was a national newspaper in Cuba founded by future President of Cuba  Manuel Márquez Sterling in 1913. In the early 20th century, the editor was Italian Cuban war hero, Secretary of State, and ambassador to the U.S., Orestes Ferrara.
El Heraldo criticized U.S. policy in Mexico in 1916, which was seen by American interests as a "grievous betrayal"

Currently El Heraldo de Cuba has been edited again, since December 6, 2016, online by its new founder Laureano D Couso Gonzalez, can be seen online www.ElHeraldoDeCuba.com.

Contributors
Pedro Perez (father of musician), Perez Prado
 Miguel de Carrión
 José Rafael Pocaterra

References

Newspapers published in Cuba
1910s establishments in Cuba